William Critchlow Harris (30 April 1854 – 16 July 1913) was an English-born Canadian architect noted mainly for his ecclesiastical and domestic projects in Maritime Canada.

He was born near Liverpool, England to Welsh parents but moved to Prince Edward Island with his family as a young child. He lived there most of his life, however for much of the time he led an itinerant existence travelling throughout Prince Edward Island, New Brunswick and Nova Scotia pursuing and executing design commissions throughout the region. He was influenced by the Richardsonian Romanesque architectural style (for his domestic buildings) and Victorian gothic (for his church designs). 

His greatest disappointment was the loss of a commission late in life to design the Anglican Cathedral in Halifax (1905-1910). The commission was awarded to New York City architect Bertram Goodhue and Harris was given the unhappy task of overseeing completion of the more famous architect's work. 

His brother was the noted artist Robert Harris.

Notable works

Broughton, Nova Scotia (plan and buildings), Glace Bay, Nova Scotia
Frederick Borden house, Canning, Nova Scotia
Elmwood House, Charlottetown, PEI
St. James Anglican Church, Mahone Bay, Nova Scotia (one of the famous Three Churches)
St. Mary's Church, Indian River, PEI

References
 Tuck, Robert C., Gothic Dreams: The Life and Times of a Canadian Architect William Critchlow Harris 1854-1913. Toronto: Dundurn Press, 1978.

External links 
 Biography at the Dictionary of Canadian Biography Online
 Historic Places of Canada

1854 births
1913 deaths
People from Prince Edward Island
Canadian architects
English emigrants to pre-Confederation Prince Edward Island
Architects from Liverpool
Members of the Royal Canadian Academy of Arts